Zorro: Generation Z is a British-German animated series that began in 2006. Former Marvel Studios development executive Rick Ungar developed the original series in association with BKN International, BKN New Media, G7 Animation, and Pangea Corporation. The programming deal and concept for the new series was developed by Ungar, G7, and Pangea and underwritten partially by a master toy license with Brazilian toy company, Gulliver Toys. What made the show unique were the plethora of Pangea-designed high tech gadgets and the conceit of having the young Zorro ride his motorcycle named after his horse, Tornado.

Plot
In 2015, teenager Diego de la Vega, the five times great-grandson of the original Zorro, discovers his heritage and decides to take up the mantle. Clad in a black suit and high-tech weapons, Zorro signs the "Z" to establish justice in the metropolis of Pueblo Grande, California.

Main Characters

Diego de la Vega/Zorro
After living abroad for sometime, Diego returns to Pueblo Grande when his father is kidnapped by mayor Martínez, to prevent him from running in the election. Diego grew up listening to his grandfather's stories about Zorro and is quick to take over the family role after he and Bernardo find the Fox Den. He rides a motorcycle called the Tornado–Z (named after the original Zorro's horse) and wields the Z–Weapon, a multi–purpose laser weapon which can act as a gun, sword, bow-staff or whip/grappling hook. The Z-Weapon also has a "DNA lock"; meaning that only he or a member of his family can activate it. In addition, his cape is bulletproof and can function as a parachute or a glider. He is based on Don Diego de la Vega from the original novel.

Bernardo
Diego's best friend and a technological genius - the mute Bernardo maintains Zorro's equipment, does online detective work and occasionally wears the costume when Diego and Zorro need to appear together. He is based on Don Diego's mute manservant Bernardo from the original novel. Bernardo is very loving and affectionate with a snarky sense of humor. He and Diego are almost brothers as they both grew up together on the same street. Diego's grandfather also gave Bernardo a small fortune which he used to repair Diego's bike in one episode.

Alejandro de la Vega
Diego's father and the owner of Dela Vega Industries. He is unaware of the family secret; until recently assumed Zorro was a myth. He is still unsure that a masked crusader is what the city needs. He worries a lot about Diego's lack of responsibility, assuming his son is out all night partying. Based on Don Alejandro de la Vega in previous versions.

Mrs. McAlistair
The de la Vegas' Irish housekeeper. She knows Diego's secret as Zorro and approves of what he is doing.

Horace Hernando Martinez
The corrupt ex-mayor of Pueblo Grande, Martinez is Zorro's greatest enemy. In addition to imposing high taxes and secretly running Pueblo Grande's organised crime, he is a business rival of the Dela Vega family and often targets Alejandro's company with his criminal schemes. He is based on the corrupt alcaldes in earlier versions of Zorro and bears a strong resemblance to Alcalde Quintero in the 1974 film, The Mark of Zorro.

Maria Martinez/Scarlet Whip
The daughter of Horace Martinez. Maria adopts a costumed identity to fight against her father's corruption using a pair of laser-whips. She and Diego are at college together and have a friendly rivalry. Neither knows the other's secret identity; until near the end of the final episode in Season 1 "Poll Axed". She is somewhat similar to Lolita Quintero in the 1940 version of The Mark of Zorro or Theresa in the 1974 version - both of whom are Zorro's love interest and the Alcalde's niece - her masked identity may be based on the title character of the 1944 film Zorro's Black Whip. According to the series' bible; her costumed identity was originally going to be the Black Whip rather than the Scarlet Whip, but it was changed to better distinguish her from Zorro.

Sergeant Garcia
The mayor's aide and head of the Pueblo Grande Police Department. Sergeant Garcia is corrupt enough to turn a blind eye to his boss' actions most of the time, but not enough to actually get involved or allow anyone to get hurt. His role is usually to tell the police not to investigate. He is clumsy and always eating (usually spilling his food whenever someone calls for him) he is based on Sergeant Garcia in the 1950s TV series, Zorro.

The Dons
A group of criminal hoodlums hired by Mayor Martínez to take charge of various criminal businesses in Pueblo Grande. When Gloria Sheffield runs for Pueblo Grande mayor, they ended up being hired by her.

Guest Characters

Don Diego de la Vega / Zorro
The first Zorro and ancestor of the present Zorro. He is only seen in one episode where Diego is somehow sent back in time and fights alongside him against the villain El Fantasma.

Isabella
The love interest of the original Zorro.

El Fantasma
The villain from the 1800s and enemy of the original Zorro.

Gustavo de la Vega / Zorro
Diego's late grandfather was the Zorro before him. Gustavo chose to keep the family legacy a secret from Alejandro as he felt that his son was not meant to be Zorro and would not want to be Zorro either. Now he often appears in dream sequences and flashbacks by giving Diego advice about how to be Zorro.

Alejandro's grandmother
Alejandro's grandmother is a Native American and, like Diego's grandfather, has died before the series begins but appears in dream sequences as a young girl who offers cryptic advice. She is probably based on the character White Owl from some recent re–telling of the Zorro story. She only appears in The Perfect Fox Hunt.

Fearsome Four
Criminals hired by Mayor Martínez to destroy Zorro but they end up unleashing mayhem in Pueblo Grande and try to take over the city themselves. They are eventually defeated by Zorro.

Alfredo Catalano
A scientist who invented an earthquake machine. After his invention was discovered by Maria and Diego he was hired by Mayor Martínez for city demolition jobs. However his first job under the mayor was foiled by Zorro and Scarlet Whip and he is subsequently arrested.

Augusto Catalano
Alfredo's twin brother specializing in nanites research. When Augusto offered his service to Mayor Martínez, in exchange for releasing his brother, Martínez demands Augusto destroys Zorro first. When Augusto's plan was initially successful in stopping Zorro the mayor changed his terms to demand he destroys Scarlet Whip as well. With Zorro's equipment infected by nanites Zorro turns to an old barn for a horse and antique weapons to fight Augusto. Zorro breaks into Augusto's lab and captures him.

Mayor Gloria Sheffield
Founder and CEO of Sheffield Industries, and mayor of Pueblo Grande. After Alejandro de la Vega had dropped out of mayor elections, Gloria Sheffield planned a series of citywide sabotages to destroy Horace Martínez's reputation in order to overtake the mayoral position in the election. Gloria ended up being the new mayor of Pueblo Grande despite Zorro and Scarlet Whip's attempt to help Horace.

Jack Sheffield
Gloria Sheffield's son is disguised as a dumb jock at Pueblo Grande College. However, he was the technical genius behind the citywide sabotages and the retina recognition program to uncover the true identities of Zorro and Scarlet Whip. Later, Zorro is able to work out Jack's role in the citywide sabotage and discovers the potential identity leak. Bernardo was eventually able to intercept Jack's retina recognition program by replacing the final image with the Sheffields.

Episodes

Movies
Zorro: Return to the Future is a feature that includes the first 3 episodes of the series. It can also be found on iTunes. 
Zorro and Scarlet Whip Revealed! is a feature that includes The Earthquake Machine, Z-Virus, and Poll Axed.

Cast
Ben Small as Diego de la Vega / Zorro
Alessandro Juliani as Bernardo
Jules de Jongh as Maria Martinez / Scarlet Whip
Janet Brown as Mrs. McAlistair
Morgan Deare as Horace Martinez
Luis Soto as Sergeant Garcia
Sarah Douglas as Gloria Sheffield
Alan Marriott as Don Ichy / Don Skull

Development and Broadcast
The show has been aired in the United Kingdom on Pop on 7 April 2008 and was shown on Kix! on 19 May 2008. This version of the Zorro story features a descendant of the original Zorro, named Diego de la Vega, as the original Zorro, fighting crime and the corrupt government of Pueblo Grande in a near-future setting. Zorro: Generation Z has yet to air in the United States. The series has already been shown in the Philippines via Hero TV and Australia on Network 10.

A planned second season of 26 episodes of the series was announced in 2009 for a release in 2010, entitled Zorro Generation Z: HD but it was not fully completed or released for broadcast as BKN International filed for insolvency in October 2009, despite a press statement from Nicola Andrews, managing director of BKN New Media Ltd in London, who noted: 'We have already commissioned and produced Season II for 2009."

External links
 Zorro Productions, Inc.

BKN Kids Zorro: Generation Z, Generation Z: HD, Return to the Future, Zorro and Scarlet Whip Revealed!
News for Zorro: Generation Z
BKN Announces Release Of Two New Films
BKN announces the first ratings on its 'Zorro: Generation Z'(TM) property on Clan TV in Spain - Show rates #2 on the entire schedule ahead
BKN International AG - BKN Signs Master Toy Licensee : NON-REG

2000s British animated television series
2006 British television series debuts
2006 British television series endings
Zorro television series
British children's animated action television series
British children's animated adventure television series
Television series created by Rick Ungar
Television series set in 2015
Television shows set in California
Films based on works by Johnston McCulley